An artwork, or work of art, is an aesthetic item or artistic creation.

Artwork or Artworks may also refer to:

Arts and entertainment
 Artwork (album), by The Used, 2009
 Artworks (album), by Art Pepper, 1984
 Artwork (musician), a member of Magnetic Man
 Artworks (film), a 2003 crime film

Other uses
 Artwork (graphic arts), a graphical representation of an image used in the printing process
 Cover art, the illustration or photograph on the outside of a published product
 Album cover, front of the packaging of a commercially released audio recording
 ArtWorks, a software package

See also
 
 
 Art (disambiguation)
 Work (disambiguation)
 Work of art (disambiguation)